The High Point-Half Moon Bluff Historic District, on Cumberland Island near St. Marys, Georgia, United States, is a historic district that was listed on the National Register of Historic Places in 1978. It is located within Cumberland Island National Seashore.

It includes the North End of Cumberland Island,  including Half Moon Bluff, the Martin's Half Moon Bluff Tract and High Point or Candler Estate.

It includes religious structure(s), hotel, and single dwellings.

References

Historic districts on the National Register of Historic Places in Georgia (U.S. state)
Buildings and structures completed in 1880
National Register of Historic Places in Cumberland Island National Seashore